The following is a list of the 100 largest cities in the Americas by city proper population using the most recent official estimate.

List 
Italics represents capital city

Bold represents largest city in country

See also
List of United States cities by population
List of the largest municipalities in Canada by population
List of cities in Africa by population

Notes

References 

Demographics of North America
Demographics of South America
population
Americas
population
cities
population